Events from the year 1962 in South Korea.

Incumbents
President: Yun Bo-seon (until 24 March), Park Chung-hee (starting 24 March)

Events

 Park Chung-hee became president of the country.

See also
List of South Korean films of 1962
Years in Japan
Years in North Korea

References

 
South Korea
Years of the 20th century in South Korea
1960s in South Korea
South Korea